Lori Daniels   is an American Paralympic volleyball player.

Career
She won a bronze medal at the 2004 Summer Paralympics which were held in Athens, Greece.

References

1988 births
Living people
Paralympic volleyball players of the United States
Paralympic bronze medalists for the United States
Medalists at the 2004 Summer Paralympics
Volleyball players at the 2004 Summer Paralympics
American sitting volleyball players
Women's sitting volleyball players
People from Roanoke, Texas
Sportspeople from Texas
Paralympic medalists in volleyball